James Keene may refer to:
James R. Keene (1838–1913), American stockbroker and owner and breeder of Thoroughbred race horses
James Keene (bishop) (1849–1919), Irish Anglican bishop
James Keene (writer), pseudonym used 1955–64 by Ida Cook and William Everett Cook when writing Western novels
James Keene (footballer) (born 1985), English footballer
James F. Keene, American music scholar

See also
James Keane (disambiguation)
Keene (surname)